Belina Lariça (born 11 February 1980) is a former Angolan female handball player.

She competed at the 2004 Summer Olympics, where Angola placed 9th.

References

External links

1980 births
Living people
Angolan female handball players
Olympic handball players of Angola
Handball players at the 2004 Summer Olympics